Helene Fischer is the eighth studio album by German singer Helene Fischer. It was released on 12 May 2017 by Polydor. The album debuted at number-one on the Austrian, German, and Swiss Albums Chart and reached the top ten in the Netherlands and the Flemish region of Belgium. In Germany, Helene Fischer sold more than 300,000 copies in its first week of release, making it the highest-selling debut since Herbert Grönemeyer's 2002 album Mensch.

Track listing

Charts

Weekly charts

Year-end charts

Decade-end charts

Certifications

References

External links
 Helene-Fischer.de — official site

2017 albums